Converse may refer to:

Mathematics and logic
 Converse (logic), the result of reversing the two parts of a definite or implicational statement
 Converse implication, the converse of a material implication
 Converse nonimplication, a logical connective which is the negation of the converse implication
 Converse (semantics), pairs of words that refer to a relationship from opposite points of view
 Converse accident, a logical fallacy that can occur in a statistical syllogism when an exception to a generalization is wrongly excluded
 Converse relation or inverse relation, in mathematics  the relation that occurs when switching the order of the elements in a binary relation

Places in the United States
 Converse, Blackford County, Indiana
 Converse, Indiana
 Converse, Louisiana
 Converse, Missouri
 Converse, South Carolina
 Converse, Texas
 Converse County, Wyoming
 Converse Basin, a grove of giant sequoia trees located in the Sequoia National Forest in the Sierra Nevada in eastern California

Vessels
 USS Converse (DD-291), U.S. Navy destroyer
 USS Converse (DD-509), U.S. Navy destroyer

Other uses
 Converse (surname), various people with the surname
 Converse (shoe company), an American shoe company
 Converses or Chuck Taylor All-Stars, canvas and rubber shoes produced by the company
 Converse College, a women's college in Spartanburg, South Carolina
 Conversation, a form of communication between people following rules of etiquette
 Converse technique, a standard method in ear reconstruction